Mount Moran is a mountain in Grand Teton National Park of western Wyoming, USA. The mountain is named for Thomas Moran, an American western frontier landscape artist. Several active glaciers exist on the mountain with Skillet Glacier plainly visible on the monolithic east face. Like the Middle Teton in the same range, Mount Moran's face is marked by a distinctive basalt intrusion known as the Black Dike.

Climbing
Mount Moran is a massive and impressive mountain which would make it attractive to mountaineers.  However, the comparative difficulty of the approach to the climbs makes it a much less popular climb than the Grand Teton and other peaks to the south.  No trails to Mount Moran have been maintained for over twenty years, and any approach overland requires a great deal of bushwhacking through vegetation, deadfalls, and bogs along the perimeter of Leigh Lake.  Instead, most climbers choose to canoe from String Lake, across Leigh Lake and then pick their way to their respective route; but even this may require some overland route finding.  As a result, most climbs on Mount Moran tend to take several days even when the technical portion of the climb is comparatively brief.

The first ascent of Mount Moran was made on July 22, 1922 by LeGrand Hardy, Bennet McNulty, and Ben C. Rich of the Chicago Mountaineering Club, via the Skillet Glacier route.  It still provides perhaps the easiest and most direct route to the summit, and is rated 5.4.  As the name implies, most of the climb is on the steep snow and ice of Skillet Glacier, thus an ice axe and crampons are used during the ascent.

The most popular route up Mount Moran is the CMC route, named for the Chicago Mountaineering Club.  The CMC is rated 5.5, and ascends the east face just south of the Black Dike.  The CMC climbs good rock and is essentially free of snow and ice.  It also has the advantage of a good camp high on the flank of the mountain.

The Direct South Buttress, a grade IV claim rated from 5.7 A3 to 5.9 C1, is a technical route suited for aid and Alpine climbing. This route is featured in the historic climbing text Fifty Classic Climbs of North America, and was first ascended by Richard Emerson, Don Decker, and Leigh Ortenburger, August 30–31, 1953.

History
On November 21, 1950, a DC-3C cargo plane owned by the New Tribes Mission crashed on Mount Moran during a storm, killing all 21 on board.  A rescue party organized by Paul Petzoldt located the wreckage on November 25, but the extreme location of the crash made it impossible to recover the plane or the bodies. The wreckage remains on the mountain today, but the Park Service discourages climbs to the site.

See also
 Geology of the Grand Teton area

References

External links

 "Mount Moran" at Mountain Project
 "Mount Moran" at Summit Post
 Direct South Buttress" at Summit Post
 Mount Moran Photo Gallery of CMC route
 NASA Astronomy Photo of the Day - Great Fireball of August 10, 1972, over Mount Moran
 A climb of Mount Moran trip report with photos and video.

Mountains of Grand Teton National Park
Mountains of Wyoming
Mountains of Teton County, Wyoming
Grand Teton National Park